Simon Abkarian (Armenian: Սիմոն Աբկարյան, born March 5, 1962) is a French-Armenian actor.

Life and career
Born in Gonesse, Val d'Oise, of Armenian descent, Abkarian spent his childhood in Lebanon. He moved to Los Angeles, where he joined an Armenian theater company managed by Gerald Papazian. He returned to France in 1985, settling in Paris. He took classes at the Acting International school, then he joined Ariane Mnouchkine's Théâtre du Soleil and played, among others, in L'Histoire terrible mais inachevée de Norodom Sihanouk, roi du Cambodge ("The Terrible but Unfinished Story of Norodom Sihanouk, King of Cambodia") by Hélène Cixous, and in the House of Atreus four-play cycle by Aeschylus.

Abkarian left the Théâtre du Soleil in 1993. In 2001 he starred in Beast on the Moon by Richard Kalinoski, directed by Irina Brook, a play about the life of a survivor of the Armenian genocide, a role which won him critical acclaim and the Molière Award for Best Actor.

He was featured in Sally Potter's Yes (2004), in which he played the lead role.

Abkarian then played Mehdi Ben Barka in the thriller J'ai vu tuer Ben Barka by Serge Le Péron, about the kidnapping and the murder of the leader of the Moroccan opposition. He then played in Prendre Femme by Ronit Elkabetz which won him several acting awards. Playing different roles and in different genres, he was featured in the adventure Zaïna, cavalière de l'Atlas by Bourlem Guerdjou, in the comedy Le Démon de midi by Marie-Pascale Osterrieth. He has also appeared in Atom Egoyan's Ararat (2002), he was Albert in Almost Peaceful (2004) by French director Michel Deville, and he was featured in Your Dreams (2005) by Denis Thybaud. He was featured as Sahak in the thriller Les Mauvais Joueurs ("The Gamblers") (2005) by Frédéric Balekdjian. He played the role of villain Alex Dimitrios in the James Bond film, Casino Royale. The character is an arms dealer working against Bond.

He has also been the voice of Ebi in the French version of the animated feature Persepolis. Abkarian played the role of the Armenian poet Missak Manouchian in The Army of Crime (2010) by Robert Guédiguian, a French filmmaker based in Marseilles, who is also of Armenian parentage.

He has also played Dariush Bakhshi, the Iranian Special Consul, in the BBC drama Spooks (MI-5). In 2012, he played the role of a drug-dealing Afghan army colonel in the Canal+ series Kaboul Kitchen.

Filmography 

 Riens du tout (1992) - Danseur grec
 Ana El Awan (1994) - Camille
 When the Cat's Away (1996) - Carlos
 Le dernier des pélicans (1996)
 Le silence de Rak (1997) - Le second consommateur
 J'irai au paradis car l'enfer est ici (1997) - Simon
 Tempête dans un verre d'eau (1997)
 Lila Lili (1999) - Simon
 Ararat (2002) - Arshile Gorky
 Un monde presque paisible (2002) - Albert
 The Truth About Charlie (2002) - Lieutenant Dessalines
 Aram (2002) - Aram
 La légende de Parva (2003) - Le swami (voice)
 Not For, or Against (2003) - Freddy Karparian dit Lecarpe
 To Take a Wife (2004) - Eliyahu
 Yes (2004) - He
 Gamblers (2005, directed by Frédéric Balekdjian) - Sahak
 Dans tes rêves (2005) - Wilson
 The Demon Stirs (2005) - Julien Cestac
 Zaïna, cavalière de l'Atlas (2005) - Omar
 J'ai vu tuer Ben Barka (2005) - Mehdi Ben Barka
 Petites révélations (2006)
 Le Voyage en Arménie (2006) - Sarkis Arabian
 Hier encore (2006) - Simon Tabet
 The Serpent (2006) - Sam
 Casino Royale (2006) - Alex Dimitrios
 New délire (2007) - Gunter (voice)
 Persepolis (2007) - Mr. Satrapi – Marjane's father (voice)
 Trivial (2007) - Pierre
 Rendition (2007) - Said Abdel Aziz
 Shiva (2008) - Eliau
 Un monde à nous (2008) - L'oncle de Noé (voice)
 Khamsa (2008) - Le père
 Secret défense (2009) - Al Barad
 Musée haut, musée bas (2008) - Gilles Paulin
 Le Chant des mariées (2008) - Raoul
 Rage (2009) - Merlin
 The Army of Crime (2009) - Missak Manouchian
 Suite parlée (2010) - 'Le masque'
 Turk's Head (2010) - Le veuf
 Des Force (2011) - Jimi Weiss
 Kaboul Kitchen (2012-2017, TV Series) - Colonel Amanullah
 Zarafa (2012) - Hassan (voice)
 Zero Dark Thirty (2012) - Detainee on Monitor
 Recon: A Filmmaker's Quest (2012)
 Les invincibles (2013) - Nino Lorcy
 The Marchers (2013) - Farid's father
 Angélique (2013) - lawyer (advocate) François Desgrez
 Gett – The Trial of Viviane Amsallem (2014) - Elisha Amsalem
 Colt 45 (2014) - Commandant Luc Denard
 The Cut (2014) - Krikor
 Pseudonym (2014) - Monsieur
 1915 (2015) - Simon
 Don't Tell Me the Boy Was Mad (2015) - Hovannès Alexandrian
 Chouf (2016) - Le Libanais
 La mécanique de l'ombre (2016) - Gerfaut
 Djam (2017) - Kakourgos
 Overdrive (2017) - Jacomo Morier
 The Sonata (2018) - Charles Vernais
 Rebelles (2019)
 The Swallows of Kabul (2019)

External links 

 
 Brief biography in French

1962 births
French people of Armenian descent
French male film actors
Living people
People from Gonesse
Ethnic Armenian male actors
20th-century French male actors
21st-century French male actors
French male stage actors
French theatre directors
French male television actors